In Greek mythology, Athamas was a Boeotian king.

Family 
Athamas was formerly a Thessalian prince and  the son of King Aeolus of Aeolia and Enarete, daughter of Deimachus. He was the brother of Salmoneus, Sisyphus, Cretheus, Perieres, Deioneus, Magnes, Calyce, Canace, Alcyone, Pisidice and Perimede. 

Athamas sired several children by his first wife, the goddess Nephele, and his other wives Ino and Themisto. Nephele first bore to him twins, a son Phrixus and a daughter Helle; and also a second son, Makistos. He subsequently married Ino, daughter of Cadmus, with whom he had two children: Learches and Melicertes. By the daughter of Hypseus, Themisto, he was the father of Sphincius and Orchomenus or  Schoeneus and Leucon and also, Erythrius and Ptous.

Mythology 

Phrixus and Helle were hated by their stepmother, Ino. Ino hatched a devious plot to get rid of the twins, roasting all the town's crop seeds so they would not grow. The local farmers, frightened of famine, asked a nearby oracle for assistance. Ino bribed the men sent to the oracle to lie and tell the others that the oracle required the sacrifice of Phrixus. Athamas reluctantly agreed. But, before Phrixus could be killed, he and Helle were spirited away by a flying golden ram sent by Nephele, their natural mother. Helle fell off the ram into the Hellespont (which was named after her) and died, but Phrixus survived all the way to Colchis, where King Aeëtes took him in and treated him kindly, giving Phrixus his daughter Chalciope in marriage. In gratitude, Phrixus gave the king the golden fleece of the ram, which Aeëtes hung in a tree in his kingdom. Later, Ino raised Dionysus, her nephew, son of her sister Semele, causing Hera's intense jealousy. In vengeance, Hera struck Athamas with insanity. Athamas went mad and slew one of his sons, Learchus; Ino, to escape the pursuit of her frenzied husband, threw herself into the sea with her son Melicertes. Both were afterwards worshipped as marine divinities, Ino as Leucothea, Melicertes as Palaemon.

Athamas, with the guilt of his son's murder upon him, was obliged to flee from Boeotia. He was ordered by the oracle to settle in a place where he should receive hospitality from wild beasts. This he found at Phthiotis in Thessaly, where he surprised some wolves eating sheep; on his approach they fled, leaving him the bones. Athamas, regarding this as the fulfilment of the oracle, settled there and married a third wife, Themisto (sons: Schoeneus, Leucon, Ptous and/or others). The spot was afterwards called the Athamanian plain. When Athamas returned to his second wife, Ino, Themisto sought revenge by dressing her children in white clothing and Ino's in black. Ino switched their clothes without Themisto's knowledge, and she killed her own children.

According to some accounts, Athamas was succeeded on the throne by Presbon. A part of Kingdom of Athamas, and himself, moved west north and took roots in a part of Pindus mountains in Epirus, called Athamanean mountains. So this population today is called Athamaneans.

Gallery

Notes

References 

Apollodorus, The Library with an English Translation by Sir James George Frazer, F.B.A., F.R.S. in 2 Volumes, Cambridge, MA, Harvard University Press; London, William Heinemann Ltd. 1921. ISBN 0-674-99135-4. Online version at the Perseus Digital Library. Greek text available from the same website. 
Gaius Julius Hyginus, Fabulae from The Myths of Hyginus translated and edited by Mary Grant. University of Kansas Publications in Humanistic Studies. Online version at the Topos Text Project.
Hesiod, Catalogue of Women from Homeric Hymns, Epic Cycle, Homerica translated by Evelyn-White, H G. Loeb Classical Library Volume 57. London: William Heinemann, 1914. Online version at theio.com
Publius Ovidius Naso, Metamorphoses translated by Brookes More (1859-1942). Boston, Cornhill Publishing Co. 1922. Online version at the Perseus Digital Library.
Publius Ovidius Naso, Metamorphoses. Hugo Magnus. Gotha (Germany). Friedr. Andr. Perthes. 1892. Latin text available at the Perseus Digital Library.
Stephanus of Byzantium, Stephani Byzantii Ethnicorum quae supersunt, edited by August Meineike (1790-1870), published 1849. A few entries from this important ancient handbook of place names have been translated by Brady Kiesling. Online version at the Topos Text Project.

External links 

 Images of Athamas and Ino in the Warburg Institute Iconographic Database

Aeolides
Family of Athamas
Princes in Greek mythology
Kings in Greek mythology
Metamorphoses characters
Boeotian characters in Greek mythology
Deeds of Hera
Thessalian characters in Greek mythology
Boeotian mythology
Thessalian mythology
Deeds of Zeus